George White Agwuocha (born January 13, 1993) is a Nigerian football player.

International 
He played for the Nigeria national under-17 football team at the 2009 FIFA U-17 World Cup in Nigeria.

Career statistics

References 

1993 births
Living people
Nigerian footballers
Nigeria youth international footballers
Association football midfielders
Kwara United F.C. players
Odds BK players
Strømmen IF players
Kristiansund BK players
Leones Vegetarianos FC players
Eliteserien players
Norwegian First Division players
Nigerian expatriate footballers
Expatriate footballers in Norway
Nigerian expatriate sportspeople in Norway
Expatriate footballers in Equatorial Guinea
Nigerian expatriates in Equatorial Guinea